Ularara County is one of the 141 Cadastral divisions of New South Wales. It is located to the west of the Paroo River.

The name Ularara is believed to be derived from a local Aboriginal word and is also the name of the local Ularara Station.

Parishes within this county
A full list of parishes found within this county; their current LGA and mapping coordinates to the approximate centre of each location is as follows:

References

Counties of New South Wales